Tsukada is a Japanese surname. Notable people with the surname include:

Emi Tsukada (born 1972), Japanese Olympic softball player
Ichiro Tsukada (born 1963), Japanese politician
Kimiko Tsukada (born 1937), Japanese Olympic gymnast
Maki Tsukada (born 1982), Japanese judoka
Masaaki Tsukada (1938–2014), Japanese voice actor
, Japanese shogi player
Rikichi Tsukada (1892–1958), Lieutenant General of the Imperial Japanese Army
, Japanese shogi player
Yoshinobu Tsukada (born 1969), Japanese golfer 
Yosuke Tsukada (born 1985), Japanese golfer
Yuji Tsukada (born 1957), Japanese football player and manager

Japanese-language surnames